Erazo is a surname. Notable people with the surname include:

Álex Erazo (born 1980), Salvadoran footballer
Carlos Alberto Madero Erazo, Honduran minister
Frickson Erazo (born 1988), Ecuadorian footballer
Guillermo Ayoví Erazo (born 1930), Ecuadorian musician, singer and marimba player
Nelson Erazo (athlete) (1959-2017), Puerto Rican track and field athlete
Rodolfo Erazo (born 1946), Honduran long-distance runner